"Waiting for a Star to Fall" is a song by American pop music duo Boy Meets Girl in 1988, written by the duo's two members, Shannon Rubicam and George Merrill. They wrote the song after witnessing a falling star at a Whitney Houston concert and originally offered the song to Houston, but Arista Records CEO Clive Davis rejected it. American singer Belinda Carlisle then recorded the song but denied its inclusion on her 1987 album Heaven on Earth, so Rubicam and Merrill decided to record and release the song themselves.

"Waiting for a Star to Fall" was released in June 1988 as the second single from Boy Meets Girl's second studio album, Reel Life (1988). The song became a chart hit in several countries, reaching number five on the US Billboard Hot 100, number two in Canada, number five in Ireland, and number nine in the United Kingdom. Since its release, it has been remixed and covered by many artists, including Cabin Crew and Sunset Strippers, who experienced concurrent success with their reworkings in 2005.

Background
"Waiting for a Star to Fall" was written by Shannon Rubicam and George Merrill, and was inspired by an actual falling star that Rubicam had seen during a Whitney Houston concert at the Greek Theatre in Los Angeles. The duo did not initially consider recording the song themselves, instead submitting it to Arista's CEO Clive Davis, in the hope that he would decide to use it on Houston's second studio album, Whitney. Even though Rubicam and Merrill had written Houston's previous hit "How Will I Know", Davis rejected "Waiting for a Star to Fall", suggesting that it did not suit her. This then inspired the creation of Houston's 1987 hit "I Wanna Dance with Somebody (Who Loves Me)". The song was then offered to and recorded by Belinda Carlisle for her 1987 release Heaven on Earth, at the insistence of her label, but Carlisle disliked it and refused to include it on the album. This version has, however, circulated on an unofficial compilation of that album's outtakes.

The tenor saxophone solo on the Boy Meets Girl version was provided in a session recording early in the career of Andy Snitzer, who later found success as a solo artist.

Release and reception
Merrill and Rubicam decided to record the song themselves for their second album Reel Life. Released as a single on June 10, 1988, it became a hit in the United States, reaching number one on the Billboard Adult Contemporary chart and number five on the Billboard Hot 100. Issued in the United Kingdom on November 14, 1988, the song reached number nine on the UK Singles Chart during January 1989, having entered the chart in December 1988. It remains their sole top-40 hit in the UK. The song also reached number 35 on Australia's ARIA Singles Chart in April 1989. After the song was used as the closing theme to the 1990 movie Three Men and a Little Lady, the single was re-released with a new picture sleeve featuring the actors of the film. The re-release peaked at number 76 in the UK.

Johnny Loftus of AllMusic remarked that the song was "just a classic", and that "the urgency as it drives toward its chorus is a clinic for durable songwriting."

Music video
The video for the song, directed by Australian director Claudia Castle, features scenes of Merrill and Rubicam singing it on a beach and inside a house. Also featured are scenes of a group of children playing with bubbles, including the couple's young daughter Hilary.

Track listings

7-inch, cassette, and mini-CD single
 "Waiting for a Star to Fall" – 4:34
 "No Apologies" – 4:21

12-inch and CD single
 "Waiting for a Star to Fall" – 4:34
 "No Apologies" – 4:21
 "Restless Dreamer" – 4:33

1991 7-inch single
A. "Waiting for a Star to Fall"
B. "The Three Men Rap" (by Tom Selleck, Steve Guttenberg, and Ted Danson)

1991 12-inch and CD single
 "Waiting for a Star to Fall"
 "The Three Men Rap" (by Selleck, Guttenberg, and Danson)
 "Goodnight Sweetheart Goodnight aka Goodnight It's Time to Go" (by Selleck, Guttenberg, and Danson)

Personnel
Personnel are lifted from the Reel Life liner notes.
 George Merrill – writing, lead vocals, acoustic piano, synthesizers, bass, drum programming
 Shannon Rubicam – writing, backing vocals 
 Susan Boyd – backing vocals
 John Goux – guitars
 Joe Mardin – synthesizers
 Denny Fongheiser – drums
 Michael Jochum – additional drums
 Andy Snitzer – saxophone

Charts

Weekly charts

Year-end charts

Certifications

Release history

Covers and remixes

The song has been covered and remixed several times. The most commercially successful versions came in 2005, when Australian musical group Cabin Crew remixed the song as "Star to Fall" (or "Star2Fall") but were refused the sampling of the original lyrics by Sony BMG. Liking what Cabin Crew had done, however, George Merrill agreed to re-record the vocals. Meanwhile, Sony BMG had British musical group Sunset Strippers remix the original track under the title "Falling Stars". Both versions peaked within the top five of the UK Singles Chart in March 2005.

Charts

Other covers
 The track "In My Arms" by British electronic musician Mylo sampled the song and was featured on Mylo's album Destroy Rock & Roll. His version also samples Kim Carnes' "Bette Davis Eyes" and made it to number 15 in the United Kingdom in 2005.
 In December 2012, a rock version of the song was released by the band Lionville on their album Lionville II.
 In December 2013, a stripped back indie version of the song was released by the English band Young Kato. It was featured on the Made in Chelsea soundtrack.
Also in December 2013, a folk cover of the song by Icelandic singer Yohanna surfaced on the Internet.
 In March 2014, a folk cover of the song by English singer Diana Vickers surfaced on the Internet.
 In September 2017, Australian singer George Maple interpolated the song as part of her single "Hero".

References

External links
 Full lyrics at Boy Meets Girl Music Boy Meets Girl Music

1988 songs
1988 singles
2005 singles
Boy Meets Girl (band) songs
Data Records singles
Kontor Records singles
RCA Records singles
Songs written by George Merrill (songwriter)
Songs written by Shannon Rubicam